The voiceless labial–palatal fricative or approximant is a type of consonantal sound, used in a few spoken languages. The former – more accurately the voiceless labialized palatal fricative by those who consider it to be a fricative – is the voiceless counterpart of the voiced labial–palatal approximant. Other linguists posit voiceless approximants distinct from voiceless fricatives; to them,  is a voiceless labialized palatal approximant.

Features
 
or 

Occurrence

Notes

References

External links
 
 

Fricative consonants
Bilabial consonants
Palatal consonants
Voiceless oral consonants
Central consonants
Pulmonic consonants